Tawfiq-e-Elahi Chowdhury is the energy adviser to the Prime Minister of Bangladesh since January 2009.

Early life 
Chowdhury's ancestral home is in the village of Nateshwar in Beanibazar, Sylhet District. Chowdhury passed Secondary School Certificate exam from Barisal Zilla School in 1959 and ISC exam from Dhaka College in 1961. He earned his bachelor's in economics from the University of Dhaka in 1964 and master's from Panjab University in 1965.

Career 
He joined the Civil Service of Pakistan (CSP) in 1968 after a two-year stint as lecturer in economics in the University of Dhaka. He completed his post graduate diploma from Leeds University, UK in 1975. He went to Harvard University and earned his PhD in 1983. In 1971, as the sub-divisional officer of Meherpur, he joined the liberation war and was commissioned in the Bangladesh Armed Forces. He was decorated for gallantry as Bir Bikrom and was one of the chief organizers of the swearing in ceremony of the first Government of Bangladesh in Mujibnagar, Meherpur on 17 April 1971.

Later he reverted to civil service and after several assignments, went for higher studies in United Kingdom in 1974. He was CEO and managing director of the Industrial Bank of Bangladesh (BSB). He served as Secretary to the Govt. of Bangladesh for nearly a decade in the Ministries of Food, Statistics, Power Energy & Mineral Resources and Planning. He also served as a visiting fellow at the Economic Growth Centre of the Yale University.

Since his retirement from public service in 2002, Chowdhury has served as a consultant to, among others, UN agencies and multilateral organizations.

Chowdhury was appointed Advisor to the Prime Minister of the Government of Bangladesh in January 2009 with the rank and status of a Minister. He advises on energy, power and mineral resources.

Chowdhury participated "UK Road Show 2015: Creating Opportunity for Investors", is a Bangladesh international investment and business seminar, designed for investors and corporate heads who want to explore the opportunities of a frontier market like Bangladesh. The country offers untapped opportunities in plethora of sectors which ensures handsome return, with smooth option to the press several times about reports by international bodies like UNESCO so as to get on with the project." If the Sundarbans is to be saved, the Rampal project must be cancelled"

Personal life
Chowdhury is married to Asma Elahi - a daughter of the Bengali poet Jasimuddin.

In 2018, Chowdhury released an autobiographical book Chariot of Life.

References

Living people
Dhaka College alumni
University of Dhaka alumni
Harvard University alumni
Recipients of the Bir Bikrom
Place of birth missing (living people)
Year of birth missing (living people)
People from Beanibazar Upazila
Mukti Bahini personnel